The 2010–11 season was Arsenal Football Club's 19th season in the Premier League. The team were within one point of league leaders Manchester United at the end of February, but a run of just one league win throughout the entire of March and April ended their challenge. Arsenal's attempts to win the Champions League were ended once again by Barcelona, being beaten 4–3 on aggregate at the round of 16 stage after defeating them 2–1 at home, whilst hopes of winning the FA Cup were ended in the sixth round following a 2–0 defeat to Manchester United. The team came closest to silverware in the League Cup, reaching the final, only to concede a Birmingham City winner in the 89th minute.

Key events 
 21 May: Striker Marouane Chamakh joins Arsenal on a free transfer from Bordeaux on a "long-term contract".
 1 June: Midfielder Aaron Ramsey signs a new "long-term" deal with Arsenal.
 1 June: Defenders Mikaël Silvestre and William Gallas leave Arsenal after failing to agree contract extensions.
 8 June: Philippe Senderos joins Fulham on a free transfer.
 7 July: Arsenal confirm the signing of French central defender Laurent Koscielny on a "long-term contract for an undisclosed fee" from Lorient.
 21 July: Striker Eduardo joins Shakhtar Donetsk for an undisclosed fee after spending three years at Arsenal.
 28 July: Defender Sol Campbell leaves Arsenal to join Newcastle United.
 6 August: Arsenal captain Cesc Fàbregas commits his future to the club stating that he "will be 100 percent focused on playing for Arsenal", ending speculation that he will move to FC Barcelona in the current transfer window.
 14 August: Arsenal manager Arsène Wenger signs a contract extension that will keep him at the club until June 2014.
 26 August: French defender Sébastien Squillaci joins Arsenal from Sevilla FC on a three-year contract for £3.5 million.
 1 November: Midfielder Jack Wilshere signs a new "long-term" deal with Arsenal.
 11 November: Goalkeeper Wojciech Szczęsny signs a new "long-term" deal with Arsenal.
 25 November: Midfielder Aaron Ramsey is sent on loan to Nottingham Forest for his recovery. The deal lasted until 3 January 2011.
 31 December: Arsène Wenger confirms that defender Emmanuel Eboué signed a new "long-term" deal with Arsenal "one or two months ago".
 1 January: Striker Ryo Miyaichi joins the club from Japan.
 27 February: Arsenal lose to Birmingham City 1–2 in the League Cup Final at Wembley Stadium. On-form striker Robin van Persie damages knee ligament while scoring Arsenal's equaliser and is expected to miss at least three weeks.
 11 April - Arsenal Holdings plc, the club's parent company, confirms that Stan Kroenke, who currently owns 29.9% of its shares, has agreed to purchase those of Danny Fiszman and Nina Bracewell-Smith to increase his shareholdings to 63%. This triggers a mandatory offer for the remaining shares, as required by the Takeover Code, an offer that values the club at £731 million, and one that the club's directors recommend fellow shareholders to accept.

Players

Squad information 

* - Lehmann made 199 appearances during his first spell at Arsenal between 2003 and 2008.

Reserve squad

Transfers

In 

Total spending:  £12,000,000+

Out 

Total income:  £6,800,000+

Loan out

Overall transfer activity 
Spending
 £12 million

Income
 £6.8 million

Net expenditure
 £5.2 million

Appearances and goals 

|}
Source: Arsenal F.C.

Disciplinary record

Club

Coaching staff

Kit 
Supplier: Nike / Sponsor: Fly Emirates

Kit information 
Nike released a new set of kits for the 2010–11 season.

 Home: After the controversial home kit of the last two seasons which ditched Arsenal's iconic white sleeves, the club returned to their traditional design. The kit was inspired by the home kits used in 1970s, which featured a white round neck collar.
 Away: Arsenal's away kit combined the club's traditional yellow away colour with maroon, a shade similar to the club's original kits. The kit featured maroon pinstripes and V-neck with maroon shorts and hooped socks.
 Keeper: Arsenal goalkeepers wore four different kits throughout the season. The most conspicuous feature of the kits were the black zig-zags on the arms, based on the template Nike used in 2010 for its main clubs. The primary kit was grey, while the alternatives were black, turquoise and pink.

Other information

Competitions

Overall

Pre-season 

Last updated: 7 August 2010Source: Arsenal F.C.

Premier League

League table

Results summary

Results by round

Matches 

Last updated: 22 May 2011Note: Premier League fixture not listed due to copyright. Results will be shown.Source: Arsenal F.C.

UEFA Champions League

Group stage

Knockout phase

Round of 16 

Last updated: 8 March 2011Source: Arsenal F.C.

FA Cup 

Last updated: 12 March 2011Source: Arsenal F.C.

League Cup 

Last updated: 27 February 2011Source: Arsenal F.C.

See also 

 2010–11 in English football
 List of Arsenal F.C. seasons

Notes

References

External links 
 Arsenal 2010-11  on statto.com

2010-11
2010–11 Premier League by team
Arsenal Fc Season, 2010-11
Arsenal Fc Season, 2010-11
2010–11 UEFA Champions League participants seasons